Quennell is a surname. Notable people with the surname include:

C. H. B. Quennell (1872–1935), architect, designer, illustrator and writer
Frank Quennell (born 1956), politician
Joan Quennell (1923–2006), politician
Marjorie Quennell (1884–1972), author/illustrator
Peter Quennell (1905–1993), biographer

See also
Nanaimo/Quennell Lake Water Aerodrome
Quenelle
Quinnell